Vlad Alexandru Nistor (born 26 March 1994) is a Romanian international rugby union player. He was a replacement player at the 2015 Rugby World Cup.

Early life
Nistor was born in Gura Humorului, he began playing rugby at a young age, after following the family tradition in the sport. He captained majority of all his junior sides he played for, and at 18 he would make his way to France for a contract with the Academy of Rugby those at Castres Olympique, who had then just won the Top 14 title in one of the strongest leagues in Europe.

References

1994 births
Living people
People from Gura Humorului
Romanian rugby union players
Romania international rugby union players
Rugby union flankers